Jennifer Francis (born 18 December 1983) is a Malaysian woman cricketer. She was a member of the Malaysian cricket team at the 2010 Asian Games and 2014 Asian Games.

References

External links 
 

1983 births
Living people
Malaysian women cricketers
Cricketers at the 2010 Asian Games
Cricketers at the 2014 Asian Games
Asian Games competitors for Malaysia